Nasser is a class of auxiliary ships built by Iranian shipyard Arvandan and operated by the Navy of the Islamic Revolutionary Guard Corps.

Type 
Arvandan Shipbuilding Co., the manufacturer of these vessels, is a civilian shipyard that specializes in light passenger ferries. According to Jane's Fighting Ships, the ships in the class are yard auxiliary general (YAG), while the International Institute for Strategic Studies classifies them as transport ship (AP). The U.S. Navy has variously described the class as "auxiliary patrol vessel" or "light personnel transport".

Design

Dimensions and machinery 
Nasser vessels can carry 86 troops or 35 tons of supplies.

Armament
Joseph Trevithick, a fellow at GlobalSecurity.org, says the vessels seem "lightly armed", adding that it "did not necessarily mean it might not have been threatening". Trevithick also opines that they could be used as minelayers. The 2015 edition of Jane's mentions that the ships are equipped with one 12.7mm machine gun, as well as unknown electro-optic systems.

Ships in the class
Known ships of the class include:

References 

Auxiliary ship classes
Ship classes of the Islamic Revolutionary Guard Corps
Ships built in Khorramshahr